Las momias de Guanajuato (English title: The Mummies of Guanajuato) is a Mexican telenovela produced by Televisa and transmitted by Telesistema Mexicano.

Cast 
Roberto REYES
Amparo Rivelles — Julia Mancera
Carmen Montejo
Columba Domínguez
Jacqueline Andere
Marga López
Ofelia Guilmáin
Elsa Aguirre
Jorge Martínez de Hoyos
María Elena Marqués
Ana Luisa Peluffo
Sergio Bustamante — Rodrigo de Barral
Ariadna Welter
Alma Delia Fuentes
Lilia Prado
Alicia Montoya
Guillermo Herrera
Alida Valli
Marilú Elizaga
Héctor Gómez
Aldo Monti

References 

Mexican horror fiction television series
Mexican telenovelas
1962 telenovelas
Televisa telenovelas
1962 Mexican television series debuts
1962 Mexican television series endings
Spanish-language telenovelas

z